The Impressions Show (also known as The Impressions Show with Culshaw and Stephenson) is a British comedy sketch show which stars impressionists Jon Culshaw and Debra Stephenson. A second series began broadcasting on 14 November 2010 and ended on 23 December 2010. A third series started on 26 October 2011 at 8.30pm on BBC One. The show was nominated for a National Television Award in the category of Comedy in 2011, however it failed to make the top 4.

Characters
This is not the complete list but a list of the most common celebrities parodied in the show.

The One Show – Culshaw as Adrian Chiles and Stephenson as Christine Bleakley. The duo usually open the show and state many bizarre and inhumane events of the week in the format of the real show. The scene usually ends with Adrian saying "But first this..." which opens up the other sketches. The scene is however repeated two or three times throughout the show. For series 3 Culshaw and Stephenson played Chris Evans and Alex Jones instead.
Ross Kemp on Gangs – A sketch which begins with Ross Kemp describing a gang he is about to encounter. Unlike the real show, he is usually referring to groups of people with no aggressive tone whatsoever e.g. Brownies. He usually scarpers from the groups within thirty seconds of meeting them whilst saying "I could see it was about to kick off; so I got out of there!" However, he then returns to these innocent groups a few "days" later and they have the same impact once again.
Sir Alan Sugar in the office - A look into the eventful goings on in the Sir Alan office but who will Sir Alan be firing this time? Sketches include the firing of Del Boy and Rodders in ep.1 and Mr. Bean in ep.5.
Ray Mears' Survival Guide - A show featuring Ray Mears who intensely discovers and describes new foods he can eat whilst surviving in the jungle. He then shows two pieces of food which are similar although one is poisonous and one is not-he often confuses them and ends up eating the poisonous before the cameraman is able to warn him
Autumnwatch – A parody of a show with the same name. The show features Stephenson as Kate Humble the regular presenter and a brand new one, the unlikely: Hugh Fearnley-Whittingstall who always seems to ruin Humble's perfect introduction and presentation of the show by killing and eating the animals being shown.
Davina McCall and Claudia Winkleman – An impression of the female television presenters who regularly bump into each other on different occasions and embark in different activities which involves having a choice between two things to do. In the excitement of having a choice both of them pass out in a long series of heavy enthusiastic breathing.
New Doctor Who auditions - Sketches in which different celebrities audition for the new role as Doctor Who, celebrities include Bruce Forsyth, Amy Winehouse, Nick Knowles, Philip Glenister as DCI Gene Hunt, Peaches Geldof, Michael Winner, Ricky Gervais and others.
Michael McIntyre – A British stand-up comedian who is portrayed by Culshaw as a very quick talking and witty person who first appeared in his house being visited by a sound inspector after noticing there was a strange noise in his house which turned out to be his own voice. He appears for around ten seconds throughout the show in the format of Michael McIntyre's Comedy Roadshow but instead the backdrop reads "ME" and he drones on about different topics making a joke.

Bad Jobs for Celebrities – This sketch features various celebrities taking the role of a profession which is the complete opposite of what they should like and plays to their personality e.g. Brian Blessed as a librarian, Kate Winslet as an air traffic controller, Noel Edmonds as a pizza delivery man or Lorraine Kelly as an assassin.
Vernon & Tess' Summer Holiday – When Kay and Daly intend to have a peaceful holiday in Cleethorpes together they are rudely disrupted by Bruce Forsyth who insists on coming with and ruins everything for Vernon, whilst constantly calling him "Roland".
Jonathan Ross: Reads the Great Speeches – A sketch where Culshaw portraying Ross reads the great speeches in front of a live audience and constantly interferes the words with events of his own life.
Where does David Cameron go at Night? – A sketch with Culshaw portraying Cameron who is seen floating around the night sky and describing his activities which are normally in the vein of supernatural children's fairytales (e.g. the Bogeyman).
The Minogues' House – A sketch in which Dannii and Kylie Minogue are paid a visit by their fictional plain, obese sister Daggy who insists on staying and demands a part on The X Factor and to share the same lifestyle as her siblings who try to politely refuse her.
Ashes to... – A sketch which involves Ashes to Ashes character DCI Gene Hunt going to other TV shows in order to solve a crime, and leaving with a female character.
Eamonn Holmes - A sketch which involves Eamonn Holmes' chat show going into an ad-break and the technical producer will come out from backstage and tell him what is happening in the next part of his show, only Eamonn usually ruins the show by eating something vital like the sofa or the table whilst mistaking them for a cake or a biscuit.
Look it's Wayne and Coleen - A sketch about the apparent lives of Wayne and Coleen Rooney in the form of a reality TV show, only Wayne is Coleen's pet dog in the sketch and he often enjoys the park or meeting his friend Gary Neville (despite the fact that Gary gives him fleas) although he doesn't like going to the V-E-T.
Antiques Roadshow - A sketch showing great and expensive finds on the antiques Roadshow however Fiona Bruce seems to be stealing any antique worth over £250. In episode 5 Bruce Forsyth also goes on the show but he wants an evaluation for himself!
Don't Get Dom, Get Done – A parody of a show with the complete opposite name. The sketch centres Dominic Littlewood who confronts various business deals for ridiculous prices for instance his own business contract which was initially £100,000 which he lowered to £1 and a cheap pen.
Noel Edmonds - Noel Edmonds speaks to the banker on Deal or No Deal.
Simon Cowell - A look at Simon Cowell's life including the X Factor with Cheryl Cole and Britain's Got Talent with Amanda Holden.
Anne Robinson - Anne Robinson teases on the weakest link and in episode 5 has a heated argument with Simon Cowell.
Ant & Dec - Adventures of the 2 misfits in the celebrity jungle.
Gordon Ramsay - Swears in different situations.
Steven Gerrard - Initially responds to a post match interviewers question then answers a second question on world politics or offering his views on complex issues.
Lady Gaga - Regularly seen traveling around shops in search of her latest outfit. She has already been seen in an appliance mart and a KFC, using whatever she can find to make something "unique".
Bruno Tonioli - Turns into a "cheeky boy" when he does random acts of vandalism to people in the streets.
Mastermind - Plays host to a range of unlikely celebrities, such as Ian Hislop, who rather than answering his questions goes on to rant about out-of-date political views and Derren Brown, who gains 45 points simply by mind reading.
Derren Brown - The man himself does simple tricks, such as stealing the nose of a child, which is clearly his thumb
The Top Gear presenters - Features Clarkson, May and Hammond, with Clarkson acting like a bit of a bully to the other two, mainly May.
Watchdog - Features Anne Robinson, normally talking about issues such as the stranger behind the audience's sofa, frightening the viewers or talking about more bizarre things.
Sophie by Jane Austen -  1814, London. Sophie Dahl can't cook (Well, boil or scramble an egg), so her Aunt Delia hires a new cooking tutor: Nigella, who invites her new friend, Hugh Fearnley-Whittingstall and Sophie falls for him quickly. But during one of Sophie's lessons, Nigella meets Reverend Ramsay.
Film 2011 with Claudia Winkleman - Claudia Winkleman hosts Film 2011 giving her verdict on different films, and talking literally about it until she's out of breath.
Masterchef - We take a look at what the Masterchef judges get up to when there preparing the tasks for the contestants.
Miscast Movies - A sketch suggesting what a movie would be like if it starred different celebrities, for example, Basic Instinct starring Ann Widdecombe, Taxi Driver starring Boris Johnson, or Saturday Night Fever starring Pat Butcher
Dragons Den - The adventures of Den Dragons Theo Paphitis and Hilary Devey.
Mary Queen of Shops - The trips of Mary Queen of Shops visiting high street shops and criticising them for their appeal and then stealing their stock reclaiming everything is fine.
Relocation, Relocation, Relocation - Kirstie Allsopp and Phil Spencer try to rehouse people who are in the witness protection program. He ruins each attempt by giving away the location.
How to Look Good Naked - Gok Wan giving fashion advice to women who are uncomfortable with their appearance, but using it as an excuse to leer at them (implying that he's only pretending to be gay).
DIY SOS - A clueless Nick Knowles being sent to a DIY store to ask for things like a long weight or rubber nails.
Countryfile - Julia Bradbury gives a piece to camera changing tone halfway through mentioning she is being held against her will by veteran presenter John Craven, emphasizing this by writing cries for help or sheep on in fields.

Episodes

Series 1 (2009)

Series 2 (2010)

Series 3 (2011)

Future
As of January 2015 the BBC is yet to announce if the programme is to return for a fourth series.

DVD releases
Series 1 – 1 February 2010
Best of Series 1 (1 hour special) - 25 October 2010
Series 2 – 19 March 2012

References

External links

2009 British television series debuts
2011 British television series endings
2000s British television sketch shows
2010s British television sketch shows
BBC television comedy
BBC television sketch shows
English-language television shows
2000s British satirical television series
2010s British satirical television series